Vítězslav Jankových (born March 31, 1972) is a Czech former professional ice hockey forward.

Jankových played two games in the Czechoslovak First Ice Hockey League for TJ Zlín during the 1989–90 season and 79 games in the Czech Extraliga for HC Bílí Tygři Liberec and HC Kladno between 2002 and 2004. He also played in the Serie A for SG Pontebba during the 2006–07 season.

References

External links

1972 births
Living people
HC Berounští Medvědi players
HC Bílí Tygři Liberec players
Czech ice hockey forwards
SHK Hodonín players
Orli Znojmo players
People from Uherské Hradiště
SG Pontebba players
HC ZUBR Přerov players
Rytíři Kladno players
HC Slezan Opava players
HC Slovan Ústečtí Lvi players
VHK Vsetín players
Sportspeople from the Zlín Region
Czechoslovak ice hockey forwards
Czech expatriate ice hockey players in Germany
Czech expatriate sportspeople in Italy
Expatriate ice hockey players in Italy